Akil Greenidge (born 24 December 1996) is a Barbadian cricketer. He made his first-class debut on 28 March 2017 for Cambridge MCCU against Nottinghamshire as part of the Marylebone Cricket Club University fixtures. Additionally, he plays for West Indies Cricket. At age fifteen, Greenidge received a cricket scholarship to Dulwich College in London, England.

References

External links
 

1996 births
Living people
Cambridge MCCU cricketers
Place of birth missing (living people)
Barbadian cricketers
Barbadian athletes